Rohan Browning (born 31 December 1997 in Crows Nest) is an Australian sprinter. He represented his country in the 4 × 100 metres relay at the 2017 World Championships without qualifying for the final. He also competed in the 100 meters at the 2018 Commonwealth Games, narrowly missing the final. Rohan currently studies a Bachelor of Laws at the University of Sydney.

On 16 January 2021, Browning ran the 100 metres in a wind-assisted time of 9.96 seconds with the tailwind being +3.3 m/s. This made Browning the second Australian sprinter ever to break the 10-second barrier—after Patrick Johnson, who first broke the barrier back in 2003 with a time of 9.93 seconds. However, the tailwind meant that the run was not legal for record purposes.

On 31 July 2021, Rohan ran a 10.01 in the heats of the 2020 Tokyo Olympic Games. Winning Heat 7, he ran the fastest 100 metres ever by an Australian at the Olympic Games.

Early years 
Being born on December 31, Browning called it "the worst birthday in sport." He was always younger than his rivals and athletics-wise was a late developer. He played local rugby and did one year of Little Athletics. When he was 16-years-of-age he started training for athletics. It was his move to Trinity Grammar School that gave him his impetus. This is where he met his current coach and Olympian Andrew Murphy. Under his guidance, Browning's skill developed  and he ran 10.47 for the 100m and a wind assisted 10.18, before he was 17-years-old. His main rivals were Tasmanian Jack Hale and Trae Williams.

Browning competed in the 2018 Commonwealth Games trials and missed the final by one-thousandth of a second. After the games he did not compete again for 9 months due to an Achilles injury. In 2019 Browning ran 10.08, the equal third-fastest Australian ever. He was selected for the 2019 World Championships, Australia's first representative in the event for 12 years.

International competitions

Personal bests
Outdoor:
100 metres – 10.01 (+0.8 m/s, Tokyo 2020; 31 July 2021)
200 metres – 20.71 (0.0 m/s, Canberra 2018)

References

External links
 
 
 
 
 

1997 births
Living people
Australian male sprinters
Athletes from Sydney
World Athletics Championships athletes for Australia
Athletes (track and field) at the 2018 Commonwealth Games
Athletes (track and field) at the 2020 Summer Olympics
Commonwealth Games competitors for Australia
Olympic athletes of Australia
20th-century Australian people
21st-century Australian people
Athletes (track and field) at the 2022 Commonwealth Games